The Interamerican Region is the divisional office of the World Scout Bureau of the World Organization of the Scout Movement, headquartered in Ciudad del Saber, Panama. The Interamerican Region services Scouting in the Western Hemisphere, both North and South America. Until the 1960s, the "Inter-American Scout Advisory Committee" serviced only Mexico, Central and South America, with Canada and the United States serviced through the then-named "Boy Scouts International Bureau" in Ottawa, Ontario, Canada. Even today, the Interamerican Region exists more for the benefit of countries south of the Rio Grande, as evidenced by the website being only in Spanish until 2011; consequently, the United States and Canada did not participate as vigorously in regional activities as do other national organizations around the world, however this is changing in the 2010s.

The headquarters of the Interamerican Region moved progressively southward from its inception until 2010, starting in Havana, Cuba, from 1946 to 1960; moving briefly to Kingston, Jamaica, in 1960; immediately relocating to Mexico City, Mexico, between 1960 and 1968; then to San José, Costa Rica, between 1968 and 1992;  Santiago, Chile, from 1992 to 2010, most recently relocating to Ciudad del Saber, Panama.

The Scouts of the nations in the Caribbean basin host their own subregional jamborees.

The Interamerican Region contains one of the five countries with no Scouting organization, Cuba, due to political constraints within the country.

This region is the counterpart of the Western Hemisphere Region of the World Association of Girl Guides and Girl Scouts (WAGGGS).

Regional Scouts administered directly by WOSM
The needs of Scout youth in the Region in unusual situations has created some interesting permutations, answerable directly to the World Scout Bureau.  For years there was an active Boy Scouts of the United Nations with several troops at Parkway Village in New York City, with but 14 members in 1959. Also directly registered to the World Bureau were the 900 member International Boy Scouts of the Canal Zone.

Interamerican Scout Committee 

The Interamerican Scout Committee is the agency that directs and manages the Region based on the objectives, policies and lines of action established by the Interamerican Scout Conference.

The purpose of the committee is:
 Approve the Regional Plan.
 Acting as an advisory body of the World Scout Committee in matters relating to the Region.
 Stimulate, promote and support global, regional and subregional events in the Region.
 To act in the name and representation of the Interamerican Scout Conference between its sessions.

The committee is composed of eight elected members so that there is no more than one member of the same National Scout Organization. These members serve on a voluntary basis, serve three years in their positions. The Regional Director of the Interamerican Scout Organization is the Executive Secretary of the Committee.

Currently (2022 - 2025) the 10 members are:

Pan-American Region Scout Jamborees

The Region has run or sponsored region-wide jamborees in its member countries. Past Jamborees include:

  1st Pan-American Jamboree-Rio de Janeiro, Brazil 1965
  2nd Pan-American Jamboree- Asunción, Paraguay 1970
  3rd Pan-American Jamboree-Bogota, Colombia 1974
  4th Pan-American Jamboree-Porto Alegre, Brazil 1981
  5th Pan-American Jamboree-Kingston, Jamaica 1985
  6th Pan-American Jamboree-Villarrica, Chile 1989
  7th Pan-American Jamboree-La Calera, Colombia 1990
  8th Pan-American Jamboree-Brazil 1992
  9th Pan-American Jamboree-Cochabamba, Bolivia 1994
 10th Pan-American Jamboree-Muxbal, Guatemala 1996
 11th Pan-American Jamboree-Iguaçu Falls, Brazil 2001
 12th Pan-American Jamboree-San Rafael, Mendoza, Argentina 2005
 13th Pan-American Jamboree-Mexico July 2010 (delayed due to concerns over the 2009 flu pandemic)
 14th Interamerican Jamboree-Colombia January 4–12, 2013 (held concurrently with the 1st Interamerican Scout Camporee)
 15th Interamerican Jamboree-Ecuador 2017
 16th Interamerican Jamboree-Iguaçu Falls, Brazil 2020

Interamerican Scout Conferences
The Interamerican Scout Conference, the highest body in the Region, is made up of delegates from member National Scout Organizations (NSOs) and meets every three years.

The purpose of the Conference is:

 Stimulate the development of the Scout Movement in the Interamerican Region.
 Promote cooperation among member NSOs.
 Establish the objectives and basis of the Regional Policy.
 Ensure that the policies established by the World Organization of the Scout Movement are implemented in the Region.
 Elect the members of the Interamerican Scout Committee.

The World Scout authorities and observers from various governmental and non-governmental organizations, national and international, who have common interests with the Scout Movement, are invited to the Conference. Each NSO has the right to vote in the Conference sessions, and if one can not attend, the voting right can be given to another NSO.

List of Interamerican Scout Conferences

Pan-American Moot

1st Pan-American Moot-Cochabamba, Bolivia 27 December 2008 to 4 January 2009
2nd Interamerican Scout Moot-Tramandaí, Brazil 27 December 2013 to 4 January 2014
3rd Interamerican Scout Moot - Cusco, Perú 27 July 2018 - 8 August 2018

Interamerican Leadership Training
The Interamerican Leadership Training (ILT) is a Leadership Training Course in the Interamerican Region of the World Organization of the Scout Movement. Sponsored by the Messengers of Peace program, the training course goals are to strengthen Scouting in IAR through a collaborative effort of sharing, networking, training, and support. The course is held once a year hosted by one of the National Scout Organizations (NSOs) of the Region. The selected NSO is awarded the rights to host the ILT two years in a row.

Youth of the Americas Award
The Youth of the Americas Award is the only award conferred by the Interamerican Scout Committee. The award is given to persons who have made an impact at the international level.

See also
Caribbean Scout Jamboree
 Interamerican Scout Jamboree

References

Further reading
 Facts on World Scouting, Boy Scouts International Bureau, Ottawa, Canada, 1961

!Interamerican